Twelve men's teams competed in basketball at the 1976 Summer Olympics.

Group A

Australia

The following players represented Australia:

 Andy Campbell
 Andris Blicavs
 Tony Barnett
 Eddie Palubinskas
 Ian Watson
 John Maddock
 Michael Tucker
 Perry Crosswhite
 Peter Walsh
 Ray Tomlinson
 Robbie Cadee
 Russell Simon
 Head coach: Lindsay Gaze

Canada

The following players represented Canada:

 Alexander Devlin
 Martin Riley
 Bill Robinson
 John Cassidy
 Derek Sankey
 Robert Sharpe
 Cameron Hall
 Jamie Russell
 Robert Town
 Romel Raffin
 Lars Hansen
 Philip Tollestrup
 Head coach: John Donohue

Cuba

The following players represented Cuba:

 Alejandro Ortiz
 Alejandro Urgellés
 Angel Padrón
 Daniel Scott
 Juan Domecq
 Juan Roca
 Oscar Varona
 Pedro Chappé
 Rafael Cañizares
 Ruperto Herrera
 Tomás Herrera
 Félix Morales
 Head coach: Carmilo Hortega

Japan

The following players represented Japan:

 Shigeaki Abe
 Nobuo Chigusa
 Yutaka Fujimoto
 Hideki Hamaguchi
 Norihiko Kitahara
 Kiyohide Kuwata
 Satoshi Mori
 Hirofumi Numata
 Fumio Saito
 Shigeto Shimizu
 Koji Yamamoto
 Shoji Yuki
 Head coach: Masahiko Yoshida

Mexico

The following players represented Mexico:

 Anastacio Reyes
 Antonio Ayala
 Arturo Guerrero
 Gabriel Nava
 Héctor Rodríguez
 Jorge Flores
 Manuel Raga
 Manuel Sáenz
 Rafael Palomar
 Rubén Alcala
 Samuel Campis
 Jesús García
 Head coach: Carlos Bru

Soviet Union

The following players represented the Soviet Union:

 Vladimir Arzamaskov
 Aleksandr Salnikov
 Valery Miloserdov
 Alzhan Zharmukhamedov
 Andrei Makeev
 Ivan Edeshko
 Sergei Belov
 Vladimir Tkachenko
 Anatoly Myshkin
 Mikheil Korkia
 Aleksandr Belov
 Vladimir Zhigily
 Head coach: Vladimir Kondrashin

Group B

Czechoslovakia

The following players represented Czechoslovakia:

 Gustáv Hraška
 Jaroslav Kantůrek
 Jiří Konopásek
 Jiří Pospíšil
 Justin Sedlák
 Kamil Brabenec
 Stano Kropilák
 Vladimír Padrta
 Vladimír Ptáček
 Vojtěch Petr
 Zdeněk Douša
 Zdeněk Kos
 Head coach: Vladimir Heger

Egypt

The following players represented Egypt:

 Mohamed Essam Khaled
 Fahti Mohamed Kamel
 Hamdi Adly El-Seoudi
 Mohamed El-Gohary Hanafy
 Ahmed Abdel Hamid El-Saharty
 Ismail Selim Mohamed
 Osman Hassan
 Mohamed Hamdi Osman
 Awad Abdel Nabi
 Head coach: Fouad Aboulkheir

Italy

The following players represented Italy:

 Giuseppe Brumatti
 Giulio Iellini
 Carlo Recalcati
 Luciano Vendemini
 Fabrizio Della Fiori
 Renzo Bariviera
 Marino Zanatta
 Dino Meneghin
 Pier Luigi Marzorati
 Luigi Serafini
 Ivan Bisson
 Gianni Bertolotti
 Head coach: Giancarlo Primo

Puerto Rico

The following players represented Puerto Rico:

 Butch Lee
 Earl Brown
 Héctor Blondet
 Jimmy Thordsen
 Luis Brignoni
 Mariano Ortiz
 Michael Vicens
 Neftalí Rivera
 Raymond Dalmau
 Bobby Álvarez
 Rubén Rodríguez
 Teo Cruz
 Head coach: Tom Nissalke

United States

The following players represented the United States:

 Phil Ford
 Steve Sheppard
 Adrian Dantley
 Walter Davis
 William "Quinn" Buckner
 Ernie Grunfeld
 Kenneth Carr
 Scott May
 Michel Armstrong
 Thomas La Garde
 Philip Hubbard
 Mitchell Kupchak
 Head coach: Dean Smith

Yugoslavia

The following players represented Yugoslavia:

References

External links
 Official Report

1976